Marcus Bonfanti is a British blues singer, songwriter and guitarist. He has released three albums and one EP, and works both as a solo musician and, since 2014, as the frontman for the British blues rock group Ten Years After. His most recent solo album was Shake the Walls (2013) released by Jig-Saw Music Ltd.

Bonfanti has opened shows for Robert Cray, Chuck Berry, Shuggie Otis, Philip Sayce, Jack Bruce, Beth Hart, John Mayall, Beth Rowley and JJ Grey & Mofro. He once fronted The Ronnie Scott's Blues Explosion and, at times, has worked with P. P. Arnold, Ginger Baker, Earl Thomas, Joe Louis Walker, Robbie McIntosh, Hamish Stuart, Mark Feltham, Eric Burdon and Buddy Whittington.

Life and career
Bonfanti was born in London to an Italian father and an English mother. In his youth, Bonfanti played the trumpet in several brass bands. His musical tastes changed when he heard Led Zeppelin's "Black Dog" from their album, Led Zeppelin IV. His mother produced an old guitar from the family's loft and Bonfanti tried to master the instrument, encouraged by his parents who were both keen on music. His younger brother is also a musician and works as a professional bass guitarist. Bonfanti worked in a kitchen to earn sufficient monies to purchase his first guitar at the age of 15. By 2015, he owned around 16 guitars. In his teenage years, Bonfanti had to swap between acoustic and electric guitars, depending on whether his parents were in the house. One of the first albums he bought was Joe Cocker's With a Little Help from My Friends. His interest in Led Zeppelin led Bonfanti backwards chronologically to the work of Willie Dixon and Blind Willie Johnson.

In 2001, Bonfanti first attended the Liverpool Institute for Performing Arts, and found the musical environment useful in honing his skills, but ultimately the conflict between college and him later working as a professional musician, led to Bonfanti leaving the course. He worked as a session musician and played solo, and, in 2007, he relocated back to London, having saved money from his playing. In due course Bonfanti became a songwriter, guitarist and singer, and recorded his debut album, Hard Times in 2008. What Good Am I to You? followed in 2010, which heighten his presence and audience base, exemplified in 2012 when Bonfanti won the British Blues Awards for Best Songwriter. Bonfanti acknowledged that the second album bore some elements of an American influence, in part because some of the material therein was written in the US. What Good Am I to You? was listed as one of the Top 50 albums of 2010 in Classic Rock. In 2011, Bonfanti played guitar on Rebecca Ferguson's album, Heaven.

The period immediately following the release of his second album became beset with problems. He was dropped by P3 Music who had issued his first two albums and, in trying to record another collection, was dropped by another label. Eventually, Jig-Saw Music Ltd offered him to chance to record at the Grange Studios in Norfolk. Bonfanti originally recorded all his work for his new album on an acoustic guitar. He also recorded what was to become, Shake the Walls, on analogue tape rather than the modern-day digital process. Shake The Walls was released in June 2013, and again listed by Classic Rock in the Top 5 Blues Albums of the year.  In addition the album got airplay on BBC Radio 2 and BBC Radio 6 Music. Bonfanti won the 2013 and 2014 British Blues Awards for Best Acoustic Performer. In 2013, Bonfanti supplied guitar work to the Johnny Hates Jazz album, Magnetized.

In 2014, Bonfanti was invited to join and front Ten Years After, which he intends to do alongside his own solo career.

Discography

Albums

See also
List of British blues musicians

References

External links

Marcus Bonfanti online guitar course - Finding Your Own Voice in the Blues on MusicGurus.com

Year of birth missing (living people)
Living people
British blues singers
British blues guitarists
British male singer-songwriters
English people of Italian descent
Blues rock musicians
Musicians from London
Singers from London